Al-Jumʿah is a sub-district located in the Al-Makha District, Taiz Governorate, Yemen. Al-Jumʿah had a population of 20,423 according to the 2004 census.

References  

Sub-districts in Al-Makha District